The Gish gallop  is a rhetorical technique in which a person in a debate attempts to overwhelm their opponent by providing an excessive number of arguments with no regard for the accuracy or strength of those arguments. In essence, it is prioritizing quantity of one's arguments at the expense of quality of said arguments. The term was coined in 1994 by anthropologist Eugenie Scott, who named it after American creationist Duane Gish and argued that Gish used the technique frequently when challenging the scientific fact of evolution. It is similar to another debating method called spreading, in which one person speaks extremely fast in an attempt to cause their opponent to fail to respond to all the arguments that have been raised.

During a Gish gallop, a debater confronts an opponent with a rapid series of many specious arguments, half-truths, misrepresentations, and outright lies in a short space of time, which makes it impossible for the opponent to refute all of them within the format of a formal debate. Each point raised by the Gish galloper takes considerably more time to refute or fact-check than it did to state in the first place, which is known online as Brandolini's law. The technique wastes an opponent's time and may cast doubt on the opponent's debating ability for an audience unfamiliar with the technique, especially if no independent fact-checking is involved or if the audience has limited knowledge of the topics.

Generally, it is more difficult to use the Gish gallop in a structured debate than a free-form one. If a debater is familiar with an opponent who is known to use the Gish gallop, the technique may be countered by pre-empting and refuting the opponent's commonly used arguments before the opponent has an opportunity to launch into a Gish gallop. Another technique is to single out their weakest claim or argument, then highlight and mock it.

See also

References

General and cited sources 
 
 
 
 
 
 
 
 
 

Debating
Informal fallacies
Rhetorical techniques